Last Unicorn Games (LUG) was a game publisher owned by Christian Moore that was eventually purchased by Wizards of the Coast.

Last Unicorn developed the collectible card games Dune (1997) and Heresy: Kingdom Come (1995) as well as the 1994 role-playing game Aria: Canticle of the Monomyth. The company also produced role-playing games for Star Trek, Star Trek: The Next Generation, Star Trek: Deep Space Nine, and was about to publish their book on Star Trek: Voyager, before the license was bought by Decipher, Inc., makers of Star Trek collectible card games. After the acquisition, Wizards of the Coast published Dune: Chronicles of the Imperium (2000), a role-playing game developed by Last Unicorn Games.

References

External links

Board game publishing companies
Card game publishing companies
Game manufacturers
Role-playing game publishing companies